Duncan McDonald (May 15, 1839 – 1903) was a Canadian merchant and political figure in Nova Scotia. He represented Victoria in the House of Commons of Canada from 1878 to 1882 as a Liberal member.

He was born in Harris, Scotland. In 1869, he married Jessie Agnes N. Brown.

References 
 
The Canadian parliamentary companion and annual register, 1882, CH Mackintosh

1839 births
1903 deaths
Members of the House of Commons of Canada from Nova Scotia
Liberal Party of Canada MPs